Confessor is a title used within Christianity in several ways.

Confessor of the Faith

Its oldest use is to indicate a saint who has suffered persecution and torture for the faith but not to the point of death. The term is still used that way in the East. In the Latin Church, it is used for any saint, as well as those who have been declared blessed, who cannot be categorized under any of the following  categories: martyr, apostle, evangelist, or virgin. As Christianity emerged as the dominant religion in Europe, persecutions became rare, and the title was given to persons who lived a holy life and died in peace. A notable example of this usage is the English king Saint Edward the Confessor.

Confession of sins
During the Diocletianic Persecution, a number of Christians had, under torture or threat thereof, weakened in their profession of the faith. When persecutions ceased under Constantine the Great, they wanted to be reunited with the church. It became the practice of the penitents to go to the Confessors, who had willingly suffered for the faith and survived, to plead their case and effect their restoration to communion. Thus, the word has come to denote any priest who has been granted the authority to hear confessions. This type of confessor may also be referred to as a "spiritual father." In the case of a monarch, the confessor might also fill the role of a confidential and disinterested advisor.

In this sense of the term, it is standard practice for a religious community of women, whether enclosed or just very large, to have one or several priests serving their spiritual needs, including being their confessor.

It can also be used as the title of the head of a religious society.

Historically, confessors were sometimes tested by officers of the church called examiners, before being appointed as confessors.

In the Orthodox, Roman Catholic, Lutheran, and Anglican traditions of Christianity, the term "confessor" or "father of confession" can refer to a priest who hears the confession of a penitent and pronounces absolution upon him/her.

See also
Confession (religion)
Elder (Christianity)
Priesthood (Catholic Church)
Starets

References

External links
Catholic Encyclopedia: Confessor, regarding the title "Confessor."
Catholic Encyclopedia: Sacrament of Penance, regarding the ordinary minister of the Sacrament of Confession, the "confessor."

Confession (religion)
Priests
Christian saints
Diocletianic Persecution